Baida is an album by trumpeter Ralph Alessi recorded in 2012 and released on the ECM label.

Reception

John Fordham, writing for The Guardian, commented: "occasionally the whole set sounds eerily like the mid-60s Miles Davis quintet reinvented as a shyly slinky, contemporary-cool-jazz tribute". All About Jazz correspondent John Kelman commented "More open, more translucent and somehow more intrinsically pure, Baida welcomes Alessi to a label whose instinctive ability to find and draw out good music where it lives remains both unparalleled and fundamental to its ongoing success and reputation".

Track listing
All compositions by Ralph Alessi
 "Baida" - 5:24   
 "Chuck Barris" - 7:36   
 "Gobble Goblins" - 4:04   
 "In-Flight Entertainment" - 4:35   
 "Sanity" - 4:46   
 "Maria Lydia" - 5:46   
 "Shank" - 4:44   
 "I Go, You Go" - 6:13   
 "Throwing Like a Girl" - 5:35   
 "11/1/10" - 6:08   
 "Baida (Reprise)" - 3:32

Personnel
Ralph Alessi - trumpet
Jason Moran — piano
Drew Gress - double bass
Nasheet Waits - drums

References

ECM Records albums
Ralph Alessi albums
2013 albums
Albums produced by Manfred Eicher